Artemisia alba, called white mugwort, white wormwood, white artemisia, or camphor southernwood,  is a species of Artemisia native to Spain, France, Belgium, Italy, Sicily, Czechoslovakia, Hungary, Romania, and the Balkans. Its currently unrecognized subtaxon Artemisia alba 'Canescens' has gained the Royal Horticultural Society's Award of Garden Merit.

Subspecies
The following subspecies are currently accepted:

Artemisia alba  subsp. alba
Artemisia alba  subsp. chitachensis
Artemisia alba  subsp. glabrescens (Willk.) Valdés Berm.
Artemisia alba  subsp. kabylica (Chabert) Greuter

References

alba
Plants described in 1764